Mountain Village Airport  is a public-use airport located in Mountain Village, a city in the Kusilvak Census Area of the U.S. state of Alaska. The airport is owned by the State of Alaska Department of Transportation and Public Facilities (DOT&PF) - Northern Region.

Facilities
Mountain Village Airport has one runway designated 2/20 with a 3,500 x 75 ft (1,067 x 23 m) gravel surface.

Airlines and destinations 

Prior to its bankruptcy and cessation of all operations, Ravn Alaska served the airport from multiple locations.

Top destinations

References

External links
 FAA Alaska airport diagram (GIF)
 

Airports in the Kusilvak Census Area, Alaska